Sacha Bali de Alencar Szerman (born May 29, 1981) is a Brazilian actor, author, theater producer and theater director.

Biography 
Bali was born in the city of Rio de Janeiro. In 2004, while attending film school, he worked as a camera operator at Rede Globo filming reports for RJTV, Globo Repórter, Jornal Nacional and Fantástico. When he graduated in 2005, the network offered Sacha a contract to continue working behind the scenes, but he refused, aiming to focus his career as an actor, debuting in the play Lado B, which he also directed, wrote and produced. His debut was in the same year, making a special appearance in the series Filhos do Carnaval, in the last episode of the first season playing the young version of the character Gebarão. in 2006 Bali made a special appearance in the series Avassaladoras, besides acting in the play Escravas do Amor. And his debut in soap operas was in Bicho do Mato as Carlos, a greedy student who is involved in the illegal exploitation of diamonds. In 2007 he starred in the plays Os Pássaros, in which he was also an author, and Pão com Mortadela, in which he was also an author and producer.

Also In 2007, Bali stood out as an antagonist in telenovela Caminhos do Coração as mutant Metamorfo, with the ability to transform his body to the point of becoming anyone else. He continued his role in 2008 in Os Mutantes and in 2009 in Promessas de Amor. In 2010 he acted in the soap opera Poder Paralelo playing the ex-convict Artur who tries to start over after five years in prison. he also starred in the play As Próximas Horas Serão Definitivas together with actress Guta Stresser. In 2011, Bali acted in the soap opera Vidas em Jogo as one of the protagonists of the plot of a multimillion-dollar prize. In 2012 Sacha did not renew his contract with Record and went to Globo where he got a role in Salve Jorge playing Morena' ex-boyfriend, Beto, he also acted in movie Paraísos Artificiais.

In 2013, Sacha realizes an audition in Jóia Rara to play Viktor, Franz's younger brother, however Sacha was older than Bruno, and ended up losing the role to Rafael Cardoso, but he was invited to a special appearance as Eurico, engaged to the protagonist, who dies in the first chapters. In 2014 Bali played Murilo in Em Família, a boy from the suburb who dates a rich girl and faces prejudices because of that. In 2015 Sacha wrote, produced and starred in the play Cachorro Quente. In same year he launched his first short movie Vazio. In 2016, Sacha acted in the film Em Nome da Lei as the cop Hulk. Bali also signed with FOX channel and wins its first protagonist in 1 Contra Todos. And in addition he also played the biker villain Dinho in series A Garota da Moto, produced by FOX in partnership with broadcaster SBT.

In 2017, Bali return to Record and acted in the soap opera O Rico e O Lázaro. In 2018 he acted in soap opera Jesus play Longinus an Roman soldier serving at Pilate's court in Jerusalem.

Filmography

References

External links 
 Sacha Bali on IMDb Internet Movie Data Base
 Sacha Bali on Vimeo

Brazilian actors
1981 births
Living people